Events from the year 1740 in Sweden.

Incumbents
 Monarch – Frederick I

Events

 
 
 
 - Foundation of the retirement fund Allmänna Änke- och Pupillkassan i Sverige for the destitute widows of civil servants, undermining widow conservation.
 - The Christina Johansdotter case. 
 - The Hats (party) campaign for a war against the Empire of Russia with French support.
 - An unsuccessful attempt is made to exile the King's mistress Hedvig Taube from the country. 
 December – Sagan om hästen by Olof von Dalin

Births

 4 February – Carl Michael Bellman, poet, songwriter, composer and performer  (died 1795) 
 
 
 7 September - Johan Tobias Sergel, neoclassical sculptor (died 1814) 
 8 December – Elisabeth Olin, opera singer and a music composer  (died 1828) 
 16 December - Georg Magnus Sprengtporten, politician (died 1819)

Deaths

 30 January – Amalia Königsmarck,  dilettante artist (painter), amateur actor, and poet  (died 1663) 
 23 March - Olof Rudbeck the Younger, explorer, scientist (died 1660) 
 
 – Christina Johansdotter, murderer 
 date unknown – Margareta Gyllenstierna, politically active countess  (died 1689)

References

External links

 
Years of the 18th century in Sweden
Sweden